Murex protocrassus is a species of sea snail, a marine gastropod mollusk in the family Muricidae, the murex snails or rock snails.

Description

Distribution
This marine species occurs off New Caledonia.

References

 Houart, R., 1990. New taxa and new records of Indo-Pacific species of Murex and Haustellum (Gastropoda, Muricidae, Muricinae). Bulletin du Muséum national d'Histoire naturelle 12(2): 329-347, sér. 4° série, part. Section A

External links
 Houart R. & Héros V. (2012) New species of Muricidae (Gastropoda) and additional or noteworthy records from the western Pacific. Zoosystema 34(1): 21–37

Gastropods described in 1990
Murex